Jack Waller (born 28 January 1997) is an English field hockey player, who plays as a defender or midfielder for Belgian Club Gantoise and the England and Great Britain national teams.

He was educated at Whitgift School, South Croydon, London. He completed his higher education at Durham University.

Club career
On 27 April 2021 it was announced that Waller had signed for Belgian club Gantoise for the 2021–22 season.

He had previously played club hockey in the Men's England Hockey League Premier Division for Wimbledon.
Waller had also played for Durham University.

International career
He made his senior international debuts in October 2018, for Great Britain v Belgium on 2 October 2018 and for England v France on 16 October 2018.

References

External links

Profile on England Hockey

1997 births
Living people
English male field hockey players
Male field hockey defenders
2018 Men's Hockey World Cup players
Wimbledon Hockey Club players
Men's England Hockey League players
Alumni of the College of St Hild and St Bede, Durham
Place of birth missing (living people)
Field hockey players at the 2020 Summer Olympics
Olympic field hockey players of Great Britain
Men's Belgian Hockey League players
La Gantoise HC players
2023 Men's FIH Hockey World Cup players
Commonwealth Games bronze medallists for England
Commonwealth Games medallists in field hockey
Field hockey players at the 2022 Commonwealth Games
Medallists at the 2022 Commonwealth Games